{{DISPLAYTITLE:NZR KA class }}

The NZR KA class of 1939 was a class of mixed traffic 4-8-4 steam locomotives that operated on New Zealand's railway network. They were built after the success of the K class to meet the increasing traffic demands of the New Zealand Railways Department. The locomotives first appeared with distinctive streamlining, mainly to hide their ACFI feedwater heater systems.

History
Following the success of the K class, there was a need for more similar locomotives in the North Island.  The new locomotives incorporated a number of improvements, including a re-designed plate frame to eliminate the cracking issues the K class were experiencing; roller bearings on all wheels; hydrostatic lubrication throughout; and the inclusion of the ACFI feedwater heater system as pioneered by K 919. As the ACFI equipment was criticised for its aesthetic appearance, it was obscured with shrouding fitted to both the KA class and contemporary KB class.

Building of the locomotives commenced in 1939, just prior to the Second World War. Main construction and assembly took place at Hutt Workshops. Hillside Workshops largely constructed - but did not assemble - ten of the class (No.'s 940-944, 960-964) and built a further five KA boilers. The primary reason why the ten KAs were not assembled at Hillside was that there was no way of transporting complete locomotives between the North and South Islands at the time (the first inter-island rail ferry did not commence until 1962). Vulcan Foundry of the United Kingdom supplied parts for fifteen locomotives, including most chassis components, tender bogies, and boiler foundation rings. The General Casting Corporation of Pennsylvania, United States supplied trailing bogie and rear end framing. A company in Auckland also constructed up to 10 tenders for the class. While the imported components were intended for specific locomotives (and in some cases were stamped for the locomotives they were intended for) in practice, and due to wartime pressures, the imported components were used indiscriminately for any KA locomotives in the programme.

Nineteen locomotives were built between 1939 and 1941, but wartime circumstances meant construction of the remaining sixteen lasted from 1941 to 1950, a period much longer than NZR management anticipated. The first of the locomotives to be completed was KA 945. All but two members of the class were constructed by 1946. The final pair, No.'s 958 and 959, differed somewhat from the rest of their class due to being fitted with Baker valve gear instead of the Walschaerts valve gear fitted to all other members, and were oil burners from new. Like some of the other later KAs, they were not built with shrouding, although the front shrouding and many front-end components had been built for KA 959 for display at an exhibition. These were ultimately used on KA 939.

In service

The KA class was solely based in the North Island, and upon entering service, the first members were placed on heavy freight and express passenger service.  They saw extensive use on these tasks during wartime. The shrouding, while cleaning up the appearance of the locomotives, was open at the top and began gathering soot and dust that affected the working environment in the cab. After the war, a coal shortage also occurred and NZR decided to convert a large number of locomotives to oil burning. The KA class were a prime candidate due to the large size of the grate. Conversion to oil-burning occurred from 1947 and 1953, with nineteen of the class done at Otahuhu Workshops and sixteen at Hutt. The conversion coincided with the removal of the shrouding, and also the replacement of the ACFI feedwater system with an exhaust steam injector.

The locomotives became a mainstay of the North Island motive power fleet and were primarily seen on the North Island Main Trunk Railway, operating the overnight Express and Night Limited from 1940. When the North Island JA entered service in 1952 they took over the Express and Limited on the Taumaranui - Auckland section, but the KA continued to be used on the Paekakariki- Taumaranui section of the Limited and Express, until displaced by DA class diesel locomotives between 1963 and 1965. On the last day of the steam power on the Limited, in April 1963 and the  Express in February 1965, KA locomotives, worked the train right through to Auckland.

The last two KA were completed in 1950, and used Baker valve gear fitted to the NZR J and JA classes. KA 958 and KA 959 were regulars on the Limited in the 1950s and early 1960s out of Paekakariki to Taihape. The Baker valve gear altered their performance characteristics making them quite free running on passenger train duties, but less effective and powerful on freight trains compared to the rest of the class. KA locomotives also worked other lines, such as the Palmerston North - Gisborne Line as far as Napier and the Stratford–Okahukura Line. KA locomotives usually pulled the Rotorua express between Hamilton and Rotorua until it was replaced by railcars in 1959 and were used on relief expresses to New Plymouth and Napier until 1965. In the last period of KA use between 1959-1967, their freight use was mainly as bankers in the King Country and the steep banks on the Wanganui and Rotorua lines, as well as mixed trains in the King Country. They remained important for passenger use because of their superior performance in the Central North Island and the fact until 1958-59 and the introduction of real air competition with turboprop Friendships and Viscounts the overnight Express, Limited and summer Daylight limited, were the main public transport between Wellington and Auckland.

The Daylight Limited offered a 13.45-hour service over the 425 miles (about 14.25 hours for a Limited or 16 hours for an Express Mail train) in steam days and sometimes ran the Daylight Limited as fast as  13.32 hours, with running time of only 11.21 hours and sustained speeds of 68/69 mph in the Shannon-Linton area. The southern section of the NIMT from Otaki to Marton junction is almost as easy graded and fast as most of the Main North Line, JA racetrack. The North Island JA were the usual power for the Daylight on the Taumaranui- Auckland section and while often at a mile a minute the Northern section of the NIMT did not offer the possibility for running faster than 60 mph. The KA had higher fuel consumption and repair issues than the JA class.

At one stage, KA 944 was sent to the South Island for an overhaul at Hillside Workshops and for subsequent use on the Midland Line along with the KB class.

Withdrawal and disposal
One member of the class, KA 949, was wrecked in the Tangiwai disaster on 24 December 1953, New Zealand's worst rail disaster. Although recovered from the Whangaehu River and taken to Hutt Workshops, it was never repaired and officially written off in 1955 as it was damaged beyond repair. Although KA 949 was ultimately scrapped, the NZR recovered quite a number of components from it and re-used these on other locomotives as the need arose.

Another member of the class, KA 951, was wrecked after being swept into the flooded Manawatu Gorge by a landslide. Both driver and fireman were killed. The engine was winched out in sections days later.

With the commencement of mainline dieselisation in 1954, the class was slowly displaced from front line service, especially as the DA class was progressively introduced to service from 1955. Withdrawals began in 1964. The last locomotive in revenue service, KA 935, ran in 1967. KA 942 was held for a time at Hutt Workshops for possible use as a stationary boiler, but this did not proceed.

Preservation

Three of the KA class have been preserved:

KA 935 was preserved by the Wellington Branch of the New Zealand Railway & Locomotive Society in 1967, and was initially stored at the Waikato Railway Museum in Te Awamutu until the site at Seaview, Lower Hutt where a railway was being established. Later KA 935 moved along with the rest of the collection to the new site at the Silver Stream Railway in 1984, being moved there in steam behind a diesel towing the rest of the items. Since that time KA 935 has remained at Silverstream and is currently out of service awaiting a 10-year overhaul. Due to the short nature of the Silver Stream Railway, 935 has been converted from superheating to a saturated state by removal of the superheater elements.

KA 942 was preserved by Ian Welch in 1972, after having been laid up at Hutt Workshops as a possible addition to three K class locomotives being used as a stationary boiler supply. It was moved to Steam Incorporated and some limited work was done on restoring it and by the mid-1980s it had been moved to Otaki for open-air storage. In 1989 it was moved to the Glenbrook Vintage Railway where it was restored to working order, and mainline certified - first running from 1990, wearing its former streamline shrouding, being used on an excursion in the South Island in 1992. Initially based out of the Mainline Steam Heritage Trust's Parnell depot, it alternated between Parnell and Christchurch before being moved to Wellington in 2001 so that a comprehensive 10-year overhaul could be conducted. KA 942 returned to service in 2008.

KA 945 was preserved by Wellington businessman Len Southward, creator of the Southward Car Museum. Southward purchased the locomotive in 1968 had the locomotive stored in Taumaranui at first, with the intention of displaying it at the car museum. Other projects demanded most of Southward's time, so in 1973 he approached Steam Incorporated to see if they could house the locomotive at their facility in Paekakariki. Later, in 1981, he gifted KA 945 to Steam Incorporated, and they began overhauling it to working order. In late 1984, the pace of work accelerated to have it ready in time for the return of steam to the mainline in 1985, a goal which was achieved. In the 10 years that followed KA 945 ran numerous excursions all over the country, including the Crunchie Train Tour of 1993. In 1995 it was withdrawn for overhaul and due to a number of constraints, it was not until 2014 that work on this locomotive could begin. The locomotive is currently undergoing a thorough overhaul back to mainline standard.

References

Citations

Bibliography

External links

 New Zealand Steam Locomotives - KA class
 Preserved NNZR Steam Locomotives
 KA motion (gear) closeup partly assembled at Hutt Workshops, 1953

KA class
4-8-4 locomotives
3 ft 6 in gauge locomotives of New Zealand
Railway locomotives introduced in 1939